DML may refer to:
 Demonstrated Master Logistician, a certification bestowed by the International Society of Logistics (SOLE)
 Data manipulation language, a family of computer languages used by computer programs or database users to retrieve, insert, delete and update data in a database
 Dimensional Markup language, is an XML format definition tailored to the needs of dimensional results for discrete manufacturing
 Devonport Management Limited, owner of Her Majesty's Naval Base Devonport
 Dragon Models Limited, a Hong Kong-based company that manufactures plastic model assembly kits
 Dennis Miller Live, an HBO television talk-comedy show with Dennis Miller
 Distributed mode loudspeaker, a speaker technology developed by Cambridge-based company called NXT
 Definitive Media Library, in ITIL Service Transition
 Doctor of Modern Languages, an academic degree focusing on multiple modern languages and cultures